Margaret of Bourbon (5 February 1438 – 24 April 1483) was the daughter of Charles I, Duke of Bourbon (1401–1456) and Agnes of Burgundy (1407–1476).

On 6 April 1472, she became the first wife of Philip II, Duke of Savoy (1443–1497). Her children from this marriage were:

 Louise (1476–1531), married Charles d'Orléans, Count of Angoulême, had children including:
Francis I of France whose daughter Margaret of Valois married to Emmanuel Philibert, Duke of Savoy.
Marguerite of Navarre (1492–1549); Queen consort of King Henry II of Navarre.
 Girolamo (1478)
 Philibert II (1480–1504)

She died on 24 April 1483 at the Chateau de Pont d'Ain.

Ancestors

References

Sources

1438 births
1483 deaths
Marguerite
Marguerite
Marguerite
Bresse, Countess of, Margaret of Bourbon
15th-century French people
15th-century French women